The Simca Chambord is a car built by Simca do Brasil, a subsidiary of the French automobile manufacturer Simca. Based on the Simca Vedette, the first Brazilian Chambord left the production line in March 1959. It featured a standard  V8 engine, a 3-speed gearbox with the shifter located on the steering column, and was assembled from parts imported from France. Related models included the Simca Présidence, Simca Rallye, Simca Jangada (a station wagon based on the Simca Marly), Simca Alvorada, and Simca Profissional. 

Throughout 1960 Simca do Brasil gradually introduced parts produced by local OEM parts suppliers. A special version, called the Tufão (whirlwind) featured some additional luxury items in its interior.

In November 1966 Simca introduced the Esplanada at the Salão do Automóvel, Brazil's sole motor show, as a replacement for the Chambord.

Production numbers 
Chambord - 42,910
Présidence - 848
Rallye - 3,992
Jangada - 2,705
Alvorada - 378
Profissional - unknown
Total - 50,833

References 

Chambord